Zakłady Mechaniczne Tarnów is a Polish defense manufacturing company. Based in the city of Tarnów, the company produces handguns, assault rifles, sniper rifles and anti-air guns. It is part of the Bumar-Labedy corporation, itself a division of the state-controlled Polish Armaments Group.

History
Initially founded during World War I in 1917 as a local train repair workshop, in the interwar period the company was part of the Polish State Railways. After the company's equipment was confiscated, dismantled and sent to Germany during World War II, the factory was rebuilt as a train repair workshop, but in 1951 it was turned into a defence contractor producing guns, firearms and machine tools.

Warsaw Pact years
From 1951 the company license-built M1939 37 mm automatic air defense guns and Nudelman N-37 aircraft cannons used in LiM-2 and MiG-17 fighters.

While Poland was still in the Warsaw Pact, other types of Soviet-designed military equipment were also introduced: 57 mm AZP S-60 and ZU-23-2 anti-aircraft guns, 2M-3M naval cannons, armament for the 2S1 Gvozdika SP howitzer, DShK, NSV and KPV heavy machine guns, as well as domestic designs. The latter group included ZU-23-2M Wróbel universal naval gun and its successor, the artillery-rocket set ZU-23-2MR Wróbel II.

Independence and NATO years
After 1989 the company switched entirely to home-designed weapons. Those include Pallad grenade launcher, RGP-40 grenade launcher, UKM-2000 MG, WKW Wilk sniper rifle, Bor rifle and ZSMU-36 missile and anti-missile system. Among projects currently developed in the Tarnów Mechanical Works are the WLKM-12 Szafir 12.7 mm multi-barrel machine gun, ZSMU-70 missile system and GA-40 belt-fed grenade launcher.

In 2012, the company merged with R&D Centre “Ośrodek Badawczo-Rozwojowy Sprzętu Mechanicznego sp. z o.o.”.

In 2015, ZMT SA became a member of Polish Armaments Group, which concentrate over 60 armament sector companies.

See also
Economy of Poland
FB "Łucznik" Radom

References

External links
ZMT−Zakłady Mechaniczne Tarnów website—

Defence companies of Poland
Firearm manufacturers of Poland
Weapons manufacturing companies
Companies based in Tarnów
Polish brands
Manufacturing companies established in 1917
1917 establishments in Poland